When Husbands Flirt is a 1925 American silent comedy film directed by William A. Wellman released by Columbia Pictures. It stars Dorothy Revier.

Plot
As described in a film magazine review, Violet Gilbert, a young wife, accuses her husband Henry of unfaithfulness when, after he has stayed late at his office, she finds in his car a card case belonging to  a woman whom she does not know. The husband is hounded for a considerable time, and then the wife learns that her husband’s partner Wilbur had borrowed his car on the night the trouble started, and that the card case belongs to the gay elder man’s escort, the blonde vamp Charlotte.

Cast
Dorothy Revier as Violet Gilbert
Forrest Stanley as Henry Gilbert
Tom Ricketts as Wilbur Belcher
Ethel Wales as Mrs. Wilbur Belcher
Maude Wayne as Charlotte Germaine
Frank Weed as Percy Snodgrass
Erwin Connelly as Joe McCormick

Preservation status
A print of When Husbands Flirt is preserved at Cinemateket Svenska Filminstitutet, Stockholm.

References

External links

Lobby card at www.gettyimages.com

Films directed by William A. Wellman
1926 comedy films
1926 films
Silent American comedy films
American black-and-white films
Columbia Pictures films
1925 films
American silent feature films
1925 comedy films
1920s American films